Zeta Coronae Australis (ζ Coronae Australis) is a solitary, blue-white hued star located in the southern constellation Corona Australis. With an apparent visual magnitude of +4.75, it is sufficiently bright to be viewed with the naked eye. Based upon an annual parallax shift of 16.89 mas as seen from Earth, this star is located around 193 light years from the Sun. At that distance, the visual magnitude is diminished by an extinction of 0.15 due to interstellar dust.

This is a B-type main sequence star with a stellar classification of B9.5 Vann. The suffix notation 'nn' indicates there are broad spectrum absorption lines in the spectrum associated with its rotation period. At the estimated age of just 76 million years, it is spinning rapidly with a projected rotational velocity of 308 km/s. The star has 2.92 times the mass of the Sun and 2.11 times the Sun's radius. It is radiating 51 times the Sun's luminosity from its photosphere at an effective temperature of about 12,039 K.

There is an infrared excess at a wavelength of 60 μm. This suggests there is a circumstellar disk of dust with a temperature of 120 K orbiting 34 AU from the host star.

References

Corona Australis, Zeta
Corona Australis
Corona Australis, Zeta
Durchmusterung objects
176638
093542
7188